The Pakistan national cricket team represents Pakistan in international cricket and is a full member of the International Cricket Council (ICC) with Test and One Day International (ODI) status. Pakistan first competed in international cricket in 1952, when they played against India in a four-day Test match; India won the match by an innings and 70 runs at the Feroz Shah Kotla Ground, Delhi. In the same series, Pakistan recorded their first Test win, the second match by an innings and 43 runs at the University Ground, Lucknow. , Pakistan have played 437 Test matches; they have won 145 matches, lost 136 matches, and 164 matches have ended in a draw. They have also won the 1998–99 Asian Test Championship, defeating Sri Lanka in the final by an innings and 175 runs. Pakistan played their first ODI match against New Zealand in February 1973 at the Lancaster Park, Christchurch, but registered their first win against England at Trent Bridge, Nottingham, in August 1974. , Pakistan have played 945 ODI matches, winning 498 matches and losing 418; they also tied 9 matches, whilst 20 had no result. They also won the 1992 Cricket World Cup, the 2000 and 2012 Asia Cups, and the 2017 ICC Champions Trophy. Pakistan played their first Twenty20 International (T20I) match at the County Cricket Ground, Bristol, on 28 August 2006, against England, winning the match by five wickets. In 2009, they won the 2009 ICC World Twenty20, defeating Sri Lanka by eight wickets. , Pakistan have played 200 T20I matches and won 122 of them; 70 were lost and 3 were tied whilst 7 ended in no result.

, Pakistan have faced ten teams in Test cricket, with their most frequent opponent being England, playing 86 matches against them. Pakistan have registered more wins against New Zealand than any other team, with 25. In ODI matches, Pakistan have played against 18 teams; they have played against Sri Lanka most frequently, with a winning percentage of 61.25 in 148 matches. Pakistan have defeated Sri Lanka on 92 occasions, which is their best record in ODIs. The team have competed against 18 different teams (including World XI) in T20Is, and have played 25 matches against New Zealand and 21 against Sri Lanka. Pakistan have defeated New Zealand on 15 occasions and Sri Lanka on 13 occasions in T20Is. They have lost to England nine times in this format of the game.

Key
.

Test cricket

Statistics are correct as of Dec 2021 Tour - Pakistani cricket team in Bangladesh in 2021-22

One Day International

Statistics are correct as of Pakistani cricket team in England in 2021.

Twenty20 International

Statistics are correct as of Pakistani cricket team in Zimbabwe in 2020–21.

Notes

References

opponent
Pakistan in international cricket